Craig Curry (born March 24, 1973), better known by his stage name Craig G, is an American rapper. He is perhaps best known as one of the members of hip hop producer Marley Marl's Cold Chillin' Records group Juice Crew.

He recorded the single "Shout Rap" with Marley Marl in 1985 at 12 years old and in 1988 recorded "The Symphony (song)" with Juice Crew described by Allmusic as "a landmark moment in the evolution of hardcore rap". He was then signed by Atlantic Records who released two albums, in 1989 and 1991, with little promotion After his experience with Atlantic his career went quiet for much of the 1990s although later in the decade he regained popularity with underground rap fans. He released another album in 2003 on D&D Records This Is Now!!! featuring collaborations with Marley Marl, DJ Premier and Da Beatminerz.

Career 
Craig G was a leading freestyle battle rapper memorably battling Supernatural on several occasions, and in the early 2000s wrote and coordinated the battle verses used by Eminem and his opponents in the film 8 Mile. The next year he wrote the character Dangerous' lyrics in 50 Cent's feature film Get Rich or Die Tryin'. His battle with fellow battle rapper Supernatural was a subject of the 2005 documentary Freestyle: The Art of Rhyme.

In 2008, he was part of a reunited Juice Crew performing at the A3C Hip Hop Festival in Atlanta.

In 2012 he released his fourth solo album Ramblings Of An Angry Old Man. He was recording an as yet to be titled E.P. With Da Beatminerz Craig G dropped his fifth LP titled I Rap & Go Home on June 3, 2016. He recently leaked music from the project online
Craig G new project the fragile ego will release September 4, 2020

Discography

Albums

Studio albums

Mixtapes

Group albums

Collaborative albums

EPs

Singles

As lead artist

Guest appearances

|2018
|”Duże Miasto”

|Gorzki & Soyka
|Kontrawersja

|2022
|"Summertime"
|Specifik
|The Triple3 Effect

|2022
|"Get Em"
|Specifik
|Get Em 7"

References

Notes

Citations

External links 
 
 

1973 births
Living people
Rappers from New York City
People from Queens, New York
African-American male rappers
21st-century American rappers
21st-century American male musicians
21st-century African-American musicians
20th-century African-American people
Juice Crew members